{{DISPLAYTITLE:C15H20O6}}
The molecular formula C15H20O6 (molar mass: 296.31 g/mol) may refer to:

 Rosin
 Trimethylolpropane triacrylate (TMPTA)
 Vomitoxin, also known as deoxynivalenol (DON)

Molecular formulas